Hajime Katō (加藤一, Katō Hajime) (1925–2000) was a Japanese painter and designer.

He was born in Kanda, Tokyo. Before becoming a painter, he was a professional keirin cyclist.

In 1958 he emigrated to France. He died in Paris and was laid to rest in the Montparnasse Cemetery.

See also 
 Hajime Katō (potter)

References

External links 
 Official homepage

1925 births
2000 deaths
Artists from Tokyo
Keirin cyclists
20th-century Japanese painters
Japanese male cyclists